Blurred is a 2002 Australian film about groups of school leavers travelling for schoolies week on the Gold Coast. It was directed by Evan Clarry and written by Stephen Davis and Kier Shorey.

Cast
 Matthew Newton
 Craig Horner
 Kristian Schmid
 Veronica Sywak
 Mark Priestley
 Travis Cotton
 Petra Yared
 Charlotte Rees
 Nathalie Roy
 Jessica Gower
 Tony Brockman
 Jamie Croft

Awards
 2003 Australian Film Institute Awards – Best Screenplay, Adapted from another Source (nominated)

Box office
Blurred grossed $1,454,428 at the box office in Australia.

References

External links

urban cinefile reviews
Film explores Schoolies Week rite of passage The Age
Parental guidance needed – for mum and dad Sydney Morning Herald
Blurred

2002 films
Australian comedy films
2002 comedy films
Films set in Queensland
Films shot in Brisbane
2000s Australian films